Gerald Willfurth (born 6 November 1962) is a retired football midfielder from Austria.

Club career
During his club career, Willfurth notably played for Rapid Wien and SV Austria Salzburg. With Rapid he won 4 league titles, 4 domestic cups and became runner-up in the 1985 Cup Winners' Cup. He also played for lower league sides.

International career
He made his debut for Austria in a June 1983 European Championship qualification match away against Albania, coming on as a 88ht-minute substitute for Felix Gasselich, and earned a total of 30 caps, scoring 3 goals. His final international was an April 1991 friendly match against Norway.

Honours
Austrian Championship: 4
 1982, 1983, 1987, 1988

Austrian Cup: 4
 1982–83, 1983–84, 1984–85, 1986–87

References

External links

1962 births
Living people
Association football midfielders
Austrian footballers
Austria international footballers
SK Rapid Wien players
FC Red Bull Salzburg players
SC Eisenstadt players
1. Wiener Neustädter SC players
Austrian Football Bundesliga players